Morató is a town in Paysandú Department, Uruguay.

References

Populated places in the Paysandú Department